Gonçalo Oliveira and Akira Santillan were the defending champions but chose to defend their title with different partners. Oliveira partnered Brydan Klein but withdrew in the first round. Santillan partnered Bradley Mousley but lost in the first round to Nam Ji-sung and Song Min-kyu.

Purav Raja and Ramkumar Ramanathan won the title after defeating André Göransson and Christopher Rungkat 7–6(8–6), 6–3 in the final.

Seeds

Draw

References

External links
 Main draw

Kobe Challenger - Doubles
2019 Doubles